Fast Fightin' is a 1925 American silent Western film directed by Richard Thorpe and starring Buddy Roosevelt,  Nell Brantley and Joe Rickson.

Cast
 Buddy Roosevelt as Buddy
 Nell Brantley as The Girl
 Joe Rickson as The Man
 Emily Barrye as The Other Woman
 James Sheridan as The Boy 
 Emma Tansey as The Mother
 Leonard Trainor as The Sheriff

References

Bibliography
 Connelly, Robert B. The Silents: Silent Feature Films, 1910-36, Volume 40, Issue 2. December Press, 1998.
 Munden, Kenneth White. The American Film Institute Catalog of Motion Pictures Produced in the United States, Part 1. University of California Press, 1997.

External links
 

1925 films
1925 Western (genre) films
1920s English-language films
American silent feature films
Silent American Western (genre) films
American black-and-white films
Films directed by Richard Thorpe
1920s American films